The Federal Street Theatre (1793–1852), also known as the Boston Theatre, was located at the corner of Federal and Franklin streets in Boston, Massachusetts, United States. It was "the first building erected purposely for theatrical entertainments in the town of Boston."

History

The original building was designed by Charles Bulfinch. It was "the first professionally designed American theater by a native architect." It occupied land formerly owned by Thomas Brattle, Edward H. Robbins and William Tudor. In 1798 fire destroyed the theatre; it was rebuilt the same year. The second building existed through 1852.

Management included Charles S. Powell (1794–1795); John Steel Tyler (1795–1796); John Hodgkinson (1795–1796); John Brown Williamson (1796–1797); John Sollee (1797); Giles Leonard Barrett (ca.1798); Joseph Harper (ca.1798).

Musicians affiliated with the theatre included Trille La Barre; Peter Von Hagen Sr.; R. Leaumont; and Gottlieb Graupner. Scene painters included Christian Gullager (1793–1797).

The British actress Charlotte Wattell appeared here in about 1811.

Events
 1794
 Feb. 3 – "Tragedy of Gustavus Vasa"
 Feb. – "The Child of Nature" and "The Agreeable Surprise"
 April – "The Chapter of Accidents;" and "Midas," a burletta
 1795 – Judith Sargent Murray's "The Medium, or Happy Tea-Party," debuts 2 March 1795.  Judith Sargent Murray wrote the first two plays by an American, male or female, to be performed in Boston.
 1796
 March 9 – Judith Sargent Murray's "The Traveller Returned," debuts.
 John O'Keefe's "Farmer," with Susanna Rowson
 1802 
 A young Hawaiian called "Bill" performed in the pantomime "The Death of Captain Cook." 
 March 22-29 – Deborah Sampson Gannett spoke about her time in the Continental Army and exhibited the manual exercise with her rifle that she learned during her service. Each night, before her speech and exhibition, the theatre company performed a play. They were The Will, or a School for Daughters, King Henry the IVth with the Humors of Sir John Falstaff, The Way to Get Married, and The Grand Historical Drama of Columbus; or, American Discovered.  
 1832 – Shakespeare's Richard III, with Charles Kean.
 1834 – Jonathan Harrington (ventriloquist)
 1845 – Alonzo Potter gave his first series of twelve Lowell Lectures. The Theater was "filled to overflowing." His topic was on the "Psychological argument to illustrate the being and character of God."
 1846 – James Sheridan Knowles' "Hunchback," with Charles Kean and Ellen Kean.
 1847 – Alonzo Potter gave his second series of twelve "Lowell Lectures on the "philosophy of man," again to a full house.
 1848 – Alonzo Potter gave his third series of twelve "Lowell Lectures to a packed auditorium. 
 1849 – Alonzo Potter gave his fourth series of twelve "Lowell Lectures to an "admiring throng." 
 1851 
 Macallister. "Soirees magiques.... Several new and attractive experiments including for the first time, the aerial handkerchiefs, and the flying watches"
 Lucrezia Borgia
 1853 – Alonzo Potter gave his fifth (and final) series of twelve "Lowell Lectures on "The Bible as the refining, elevating and improving instrument of humanity."

Image gallery

References

Further reading

 John Alden. "A Season in Federal Street: J. B. Williamson and the Boston Theatre, 1796–1797." Proceedings of the American Antiquarian Society 65 (1): 9–74. 1955.
 Martin Banham (1998). The Cambridge Guide to Theatre. New York: Cambridge University Press. Cf. especially p. 361, article on the "Federal Street Theatre".
 Frank Chouteau Brown. "The First Boston Theatre, on Federal Street: Built 1793, finally discontinued 1852. Charles Bulfinch, Architect," Old-Time New England, v.36 (1945), 1–7.
 Brooks McNamara. The American Playhouse in the Eighteenth Century (Cambridge, Mass.: Harvard University Press, 1969), pp. 121–27.
 Douglass Shand-Tucci (1999). Built in Boston: City and Suburb, 1800–2000. Amherst: University of Massachusetts Press. Cf. p. 209
 Caleb Snow. History of Boston, 2nd ed. 1828.
 Richard Stoddard. A Reconstruction of Charles Bulfinch's First Federal Street Theatre, Boston. Winterthur Portfolio, Vol. 6 (1970), pp. 185–208.
 Richard Stoddard. "Aqueduct and Iron Curtain at the Federal Street Theatre, Boston," Theatre Survey, VIII (1967), 106–11.

External links
 Boston Public Library. Federal Street Theatre Collection
 Harvard Theatre Collection, Houghton Library, Harvard College Library. Early American playbills: Guide; includes playbills from the Federal St. Theatre
 
 
 

Theatres completed in 1793
Former buildings and structures in Boston
1793 establishments in Massachusetts
1852 disestablishments in Massachusetts
Cultural history of Boston
18th century in Boston
19th century in Boston
Former theatres in Boston
Financial District, Boston
Event venues established in 1793
Charles Bulfinch buildings